FC Spartak Tuymazy is a Russian football team from Tuymazy.

Club history
The club was founded in 1967 and played on amateur levels. It was licensed for the third-tier Russian FNL 2 for the 2021–22 season. The club dropped out of the professional competitions following the season.

References

Association football clubs established in 1967
Football clubs in Russia
Sport in Bashkortostan
1967 establishments in Russia